Luciano Valerio Harry  (born 19 January 1979) is a Honduran footballer who last played for Honduran club Honduras Progreso.

A native of the town of Tela in Atlántida Department on the northern Caribbean coast, Luciano Valerio Harry began his career in 1999 at Club Bronco and, during the next decade, played for Club Deportivo Olimpia, Club Deportivo Marathón, Honduras Salzburg, Universidad, Deportivo Lenca and C.D. Real Juventud.

External links
Luciano Valerio Harry career statistics at All Soccer Players
"Con pocos goles": ESPN Sports report (5 April 2009) on a game in which Luciano Valerio Harry participated 

1979 births
Living people
People from Tela
Honduran footballers
Honduran expatriate footballers
C.D. Olimpia players
C.D. Marathón players
C.D. Real Juventud players
C.D. Vista Hermosa footballers
Expatriate footballers in El Salvador
Association football forwards